Blastococcus capsensis is a Gram-positive  bacterium from the genus of Blastococcus which has been isolated from a limestone rock.

References

 

Bacteria described in 2016
Actinomycetia